is a song recorded by Japanese singer-songwriter Ayaka and Japanese singer Daichi Miura. It was released as a single by A Station on Valentine's Day, February 14, 2018. The song was written by Ayaka and produced by Takeshi Kobayashi. "Heart Up" was used in television ads for Tokyo Metro's Find My Tokyo campaign, starring actress Satomi Ishihara. The song also served as the theme song for the February 2018 broadcasts of the AX morning show Sukkiri. The CD single was released in standard CD-only and CD/DVD versions.

Background and composition
In April 2017, Ayaka, Miura and Kobayashi met up to discuss creating a song for a nationwide television ad campaign. Over the summer, Ayaka and Kobayashi wrote and arranged a rough demo of the song, which they then sent to Miura. On September 8, 2017, after having performed together at the 908 Festival 2017, organized by Kreva, Ayaka and Miura gathered in studio to record the vocal track and Kobayashi then completed the arrangement for the song. Ayaka describes the song as being about "overcoming the bittersweet nature of love and rising up from heartbreak".

Chart performance
"Heart Up" entered the daily Oricon Singles Chart at number 23, and peaked at number 17. The single debuted at number 23 on the weekly Oricon Singles Chart, with 5,000 copies sold. On the Oricon Digital Singles Chart, "Heart Up" debuted at number 9, with 14,000 downloads sold.

Track listing

Charts

Sales

References

2018 songs
2018 singles
Ayaka songs
Songs written by Ayaka
Song recordings produced by Takeshi Kobayashi
A Station singles